Ross Laidlaw (born 12 July 1992) is a Scottish footballer who plays as a goalkeeper for Ross County. He has previously played for Raith Rovers, Elgin City, Hibernian and Dundee United.

Career

Raith Rovers
Laidlaw began his playing career for the Raith Rovers under-19 side. He progressed to the senior side and appeared on bench on two occasions during the 2010–11 season. He featured in pre-season friendly matches in advance of the 2011–12 season, the final of which was against Southend United in a scoreless draw. Following the departure of Andrew McNeil he became the regular back-up goalkeeper to David McGurn.

However he suffered a setback, injuring his knee, with Raith having to sign Ludovic Roy as a temporary replacement. After recovering from injury, Laidlaw made his senior debut on 3 March 2012, keeping a clean sheet in a 5–0 home victory against Greenock Morton.

On 22 January 2015, he joined Elgin City on loan. His last game for Elgin was in April 2015, a 5–4 defeat against Annan Athletic. Laidlaw returned to Raith after this loan spell, but failed to displace Kevin Cuthbert as first-choice goalkeeper. In December 2015 he suffered a torn kidney, which kept him out of action for the rest of the season. Laidlaw left Raith at the end of the 2015–16 season.

Hibernian
On 6 July 2016, Laidlaw signed a one-year contract with Hibernian. He made his first appearance for Hibernian in the second leg of a Europa League qualifier against Brondby. Laidlaw kept a clean sheet as Hibs won 1–0 in the second leg, but were knocked out of the competition after a penalty shootout. Although he mainly served as a backup to Ofir Marciano during the 2016–17 season, Laidlaw made 18 first team appearances.

He signed a two-year contract with Hibs in May 2017. Laidlaw temporarily took over as first choice goalkeeper in September, as Marciano missed one game due to him observing Yom Kippur. He injured a shoulder in November, and this eventually required surgery. Laidlaw returned to first-team training in June 2018. He made his first appearance since injury on 9 August, in a Europa League qualifier against Molde.

Laidlaw moved on loan to Championship club Dundee United in January 2019. In May 2019, Hibs announced that Laidlaw would be released at the end of the season.

Ross County
On 30 May 2019 Laidlaw signed for newly promoted Scottish Premiership team Ross County on a two-year contract. On 13 July 2019, he made his debut for Ross County against Montrose in the Scottish League Cup. After winning Ross County’s player of the year award for the 2020-21 season Laidlaw signed a new two year contract with the club.

Career statistics

Honours
Raith Rovers
Scottish Challenge Cup: 2013–14 

Hibernian
Scottish Championship: 2016–17

Notes

References

External links
 

1992 births
Living people
Scottish footballers
Scottish Professional Football League players
Scottish Football League players
Raith Rovers F.C. players
Elgin City F.C. players
Hibernian F.C. players
Dundee United F.C. players
Association football goalkeepers
Sportspeople from Livingston, West Lothian
Ross County F.C. players